Sunnyside is a historic plantation house located at Heathsville, Northumberland County, Virginia.  It was built about 1822, and is a two-story, single-pile, central-passage-plan Federal style brick I-house.  It is topped by a gabled standing seam metal roof and has a two-story kitchen addition and a two-story rear addition. The front facade features a one-story, flat-roofed portico featuring paired Doric order columns. Also on the property are the contributing former smokehouse, dairy, guest house (formerly a kitchen), carriage house, corn crib, and barn.  It is located in the Heathsville Historic District.

It was listed on the National Register of Historic Places in 1996.

References

Plantation houses in Virginia
Houses on the National Register of Historic Places in Virginia
Federal architecture in Virginia
Houses completed in 1822
Houses in Northumberland County, Virginia
National Register of Historic Places in Northumberland County, Virginia
Individually listed contributing properties to historic districts on the National Register in Virginia
1822 establishments in Virginia